Chelford railway station serves the village of Chelford in Cheshire, England.

History

The station was rebuilt in 1960 by the architect William Robert Headley.

1894 rail crash

On 22 December 1894 a strong wind blew a high-sided freight wagon into violent contact with other wagons, causing one to overturn and block the main line. An express train between London and Manchester collided with the wagon; 14 people were killed, and 48 injured.

Services

Following the timetable changes in December 2008 there exists an hourly service southbound to Crewe and northbound to Manchester Piccadilly via Stockport.
Services to Manchester via Manchester Airport run 'semi-fast' and skip the station, though a few services via Manchester Airport do call here (mainly at peak times). Services are operated by Northern.

The December 2008 timetable also saw the introduction of a regular 2-hourly Sunday service to Manchester Piccadilly and Crewe.

References

Further reading

External links

 Article includes information on the rail accident, including a photograph
 Crewe-Manchester Community Rail Partnership

Railway stations in Cheshire
DfT Category F2 stations
Former London and North Western Railway stations
Railway stations in Great Britain opened in 1842
Northern franchise railway stations
1842 establishments in England
William Robert Headley railway stations